Dathus or Datus, was elected Bishop of Ravenna, when miraculously, a dove appeared above his head.

References

Saints from Roman Italy
2nd-century Christian saints
190 deaths
2nd-century Italian bishops
2nd-century Romans
Year of birth unknown
Bishops of Ravenna